Riverside is a historic house museum in Hamilton, Montana, U.S.. It was the private residence of Margaret Daly, copper magnate Marcus Daly's widow. It is listed on the National Register of Historic Places.

History
The house was first built for homesteader Anthony Chaffin. After the home and surrounding ranchland was purchased by copper magnate Marcus Daly in 1886, it was redesigned in the Queen Anne architectural style, with a tower. Daly's widow, Margaret, hired architect A. J. Gibson to redesign it in the Colonial Revival and Georgian Revival styles in 1910.

Margaret Daly died in 1941, and the house was ultimately inherited by her granddaughter, Countess Margit Sigray Bessenyey of Hungary, in the 1950s. When she died, it was inherited by her stepson, Francis Bakach-Bessenyey, who deeded it to the state of Montana in 1986 in exchange for forgiveness of $400,000 in inheritance taxes. The Daly Mansion Preservation Trust was established, in part with a donation from him.

The house has been listed on the National Register of Historic Places since July 16, 1987. It is now a house museum.

References

External links
Website

National Register of Historic Places in Ravalli County, Montana
Colonial Revival architecture in Montana
Houses completed in 1910
Historic house museums in Montana
Hamilton, Montana
Houses on the National Register of Historic Places in Montana
Houses in Ravalli County, Montana